8 Megales Epitihies is the first EP album by popular Greek pop rock singer Sakis Rouvas, released in 2006 by his former label Universal Music, along with the imprint of Mercury Records.

Track listing

External links
 Official site

2006 debut EPs
Sakis Rouvas EPs
Albums produced by Nikos Karvelas
Albums produced by Nikos Terzis
Greek-language albums
Universal Music Greece EPs